A Summer Place may refer to:

 A Summer Place (novel), a 1958 novel by Sloan Wilson
 A Summer Place (film), a 1959 American romantic drama film based on the novel
 Theme from A Summer Place, a 1959 song written for the film